The Thenmala dam is the second largest irrigation project in Kerala, India. It impounds the longest reservoir in the state and water from the reservoir is also used for power generation.

The dam was started in 1961 under the Kallada Irrigation and Tree Crop development project with an original cost of Rs. 13.28 crores. The  revised estimate of Rs. 728 crores at the 1999 schedule of rates made the cost escalation to be reported at 5,356 per cent. The ayacut targeted was 61630 hectares (net) and 92800 hectares (gross). Though the project was targeted for completion, and priority in allocation was given during Ninth Plan, it could not be completed and commissioned fully.

It is now a centre of attraction at Thenmala and an ecotourism destination, with boating available on the reservoir, which is bordered on both sides by the Shendurney Wildlife Sanctuary. This place has facilities like winding pathways, sway bridge, amphitheatre and a musical fountain. Visitors can also visit the traditional tree houses of the tribal in this area. There are also boating facilities in the reservoir. There is a rope bridge along with many trekking, mountaineering and biking opportunities.

See also

 List of dams and reservoirs in India

References

External links 

 Thenmala.info
 Thenmala HEP Short film by KSEB

Dams in Kerala
Tourist attractions in Kollam district
Dams completed in 1986
1986 establishments in Kerala
20th-century architecture in India